Prasanta Kumar Pattanaik (born 5 April 1943), is emeritus professor at the Department of Economics at the University of California. He is a Fellow of the Econometric Society.

Along with Amartya Sen and Kenneth Arrow, Pattanaik is an advisory editor for the journal Social Choice and Welfare.

He is a recipient of the Padma Shri award of 2020 by the Government of India in Literature and Education.

Education 
Pattanaik gained his degree in economics from Utkal University, Odisha, India. He then went on to study for his masters and doctorate, both in economics, at the prestigious Delhi School of Economics University of Delhi.

Pattanaik studied under, the Nobel Prize winning economist, Amartya Sen and his "leadership role" in the study of social choice theory has been acknowledged by Sen.

Selected bibliography

Book series 
Pattanaik is one of the series editors for the Springer series Studies in Choice and Welfare, which included being co-editor of Rational choice and social welfare theory and applications: essays in honor of Kotaro Suzumura.

Books 
 
 
  Papers presented at the symposium on collective choice, which was held in Caen, from 4 September to 9 September 1980.

Chapters in books 
 
Also available as: a journal article.
 
Also available as: a journal article.

Journal articles 
1965–1969
 
 
 
 

1970–1974
 
 
 
 

1975–1979
 
 
 

1980–1984
 
 

1985–1989
 
 
 
 
 
 

1990–1994
 
 
 

1995–1999
 
 
 
 
 

2000–2004
 
 

2005–2009
 
 
 

2010–2014

Discussion papers 
  Discussion paper number 8807.
  Discussion paper number 9105.
  Occasional paper series on culture and development, 2. 
  Working paper series 9903.
  
 
 
  IZA discussion paper number 4818.

References

External links 
 Profile: Prasanta Pattanaik  Department of Economics, University of California, Riverside
 Prasanta Pattanaik  Oxford Poverty & Human Development Initiative, University of Oxford

1943 births
Living people
Odia people
Microeconomists
Political philosophers
University of California, Riverside faculty
Delhi University alumni
Utkal University alumni
Fellows of the Econometric Society